Although American Samoa will not participate in the 2024 presidential election because it is a U.S. territory and not a state, it will still participate in the U.S. presidential primaries and caucuses.

Republican caucus 
The 2024 American Samoa Republican presidential caucus will be held on March 20, 2024, as part of the Republican Party primaries for the 2024 presidential election. 9 delegates to the 2024 Republican National Convention will be allocated on a delegate selection basis.

Candidates 
Former president Donald Trump and former South Carolina governor and U.S. Ambassador to the United Nations Nikki Haley are the only main contenders to officially announce their candidacy so far, although Florida governor Ron DeSantis is widely expected to announce his candidacy as soon as May 2023.

See also 
 2024 Republican Party presidential primaries
 2024 United States presidential election
 2024 United States elections

References 

American Samoa caucuses
Presidential caucuses
American Samoa